This is a list of people and/or alumni associated with Earl Haig Secondary School or its associated Claude Watson Arts Program.

Acting, film and television
Melyssa Ade, Canadian actress (b. 1976)
David Alpay, Canadian actor (b. 1980)
John Bregar, Canadian actor (b. 1985)
Stefan Brogren, Canadian actor and director (b. 1972)
Arisa Cox, Canadian TV and radio personality (b. 1978)
Deborah Cox, Canadian singer and actress (b. 1974)
Andrea Donaldson, Canadian director and dramaturge
Ephraim Ellis, Canadian actor (b. 1985)
Jake Epstein, Canadian actor and singer (b. 1987)
Ennis Esmer, Canadian actor and comedian (b. 1978)
Yani Gellman, Canadian actor (b. 1985)
Paul Gross, Canadian actor, producer, director, singer and writer (b. 1959)
Danielle Hampton, Canadian actress (b. 1978)
John Stephen Hill, actor; playwright under the name Steve Hill (b. 1953)
Christopher Jacot, Canadian actor (b. 1979)
Sabrina Jalees, Canadian TV personality (b. 1985)
Justin Kelly, Canadian actor (b. 1992)
Melanie Leishman, Canadian actress (b. 1989)
Britne Oldford, Canadian actress (b. 1992)
Greta Onieogou, Canadian actress (b. 1991)
Cara Pifko, Canadian actress (b. 1976)
Jennifer Podemski, film and television producer and actor (b. 1974)
Sarah Polley, Canadian actress (b. 1979)
Rachel Skarsten, Canadian actress (b. 1985)
Paul Snider, Canadian actor, producer, director, singer and songwriter (b. 1962)
Scott Speedman, Canadian actor (b. 1975)
Ksenia Solo, Canadian actress (b. 1987)
Sara Waisglass, Canadian actress (Ginny and Georgia) (b. 1998)

Education, research and technology
David Siderovski, Professor and Chair of Pharmacology & Neuroscience for the University of North Texas Health Science Center (b. 1966)

Music
David Clayton-Thomas, singer/musician Blood Sweat & Tears
Ana Simina Kalkbrenner née Grigoriu, Romanian-born Canadian-German electronic musician (b. 1981)
Scott Helman, indie singer-songwriter (b. 1995)
krNfx (Terry Im), beatboxer and singer (b. 1989)
Kelvin Kwan, Hong Kong singer (b. 1983)
Adam Messinger, Canadian songwriter (b. 1976)
Adrian Eccleston, known as "Adrian X", Canadian guitarist (b. 1976)
Glenn Morrison (DJ), Canadian DJ (b. 1985)

Sports
Herb Carnegie, Canadian ice hockey player (1919 – 2012)
Daniel Nestor, Serbian Canadian tennis player (b. 1972)
Dwight Powell, Canadian NBA player (b. 1991)

Dance and modelling
Michelle Monkhouse, Canadian fashion model (1991-2011)

Politics
 William F. Bell, (1938–2013), late mayor of Richmond Hill, Ontario 
 David Crombie, (b. 1936), former mayor of Toronto and federal  cabinet minister
 Dr. Bette Stephenson (1924–2019), Progressive Conservative MPP and Ontario deputy premier, minister of education, and treasurer

References

Earl Haig Secondary School